The 1989 Texas Longhorns football team represented the University of Texas at Austin in the 1989 NCAA Division I-A football season.  The Longhorns finished the season with a 5–6 record.

Schedule

Personnel

Season summary

at Colorado

at SMU

Penn State

Rice

vs Oklahoma

at Arkansas

Texas Tech

at Houston

TCU

Baylor

at Texas A&M

References

Texas
Texas Longhorns football seasons
Texas Longhorns football